Kostoľany nad Hornádom is a village and municipality of Košice-okolie District in the Košice Region of eastern Slovakia, about 10 km north of the city of Košice.

History
In historical records, the village was first mentioned in 1423.

Geography
The village lies at an altitude of 270 metres and covers an area of 9.1 km².
It has a population of 1186 people.

Notable people

Matylda Pálfyová (1912-1944), gymnast

Villages and municipalities in Košice-okolie District
Šariš